Hits Radio UK is a national digital radio station based in Manchester, England, owned and operated by Bauer as part of the Hits Radio network. It broadcasts to the United Kingdom.

As of December 2022, the station has a weekly audience of 1.3 million listeners according to RAJAR.

Overview

The national station launched on 1 April 2003 as The Hits. The station was rebranded on 4 June 2018 as Hits Radio UK. It relays Hits Radio Manchester programming but with UK wide news & information, traffic bulletins and advertising.

Hits Radio UK broadcasts on DAB in many parts of the UK, nationally on Freeview and Sky TV platforms and online.

Technical
The launch of Hits Radio UK in 2018 saw the station added to DAB multiplex transmissions in a number of local areas - mostly those served by Arqiva's NOWdigital multiplexes, as well as being made available on the CE Birmingham multiplex (replacing 'Magic Soul') and in stereo in London (replacing Kerrang! Radio and Absolute Radio 70s, which were removed on 23 May and replaced with a Hits Radio UK placeholder).

Hits Radio UK replaced The Hits on Bauer's DAB multiplexes and on the Arqiva-operated commercial Freeview multiplex. In addition, the new network was provided over the Sky satellite TV platform, on a channel previously occupied by Absolute Radio 70s.

Logo history

References

External links
Hits Radio

British radio networks
Bauer Radio
Bauer Group (UK)
Hits Radio
Radio stations in Manchester
Radio stations established in 2003